Frederick E. Grambau (born August 30, 1950; died December 13, 2017) was an American football player for the Kansas City Chiefs. He played college football for the University of Michigan from 1969 to 1972 and professional football for the Hamilton Tiger-Cats from 1973 to 1975.

Michigan
A native of Ossineke, Michigan, Grambau attended Alpena High School.  He later played college football as a defensive tackle at the University of Michigan from 1969 to 1972. He missed the 1970 season with a knee injury, but returned to the Wolverines in 1971.  

As a senior, Grambau started all 11 games at the defensive left tackle position for the 1972 Michigan Wolverines football team that compiled a 10-1 record, allowed opponents to score only 57 points (5.2 points per game), and finished the season ranked No. 6 in both the AP and UPI polls.  He was selected as a first-team All-Big Ten Conference player in 1972.  He was also selected as a starter on defense for the East team in the 1972 East–West Shrine Game in San Francisco.

Professional football
Grambau was drafted by the Kansas City Chiefs in the fifth round (120th overall pick) of the 1973 NFL Draft.  He played professional football for the Hamilton Tiger-Cats in the Canadian Football League (CFL) from 1973 to 1974.  He was selected as an All-CFL defensive player in 1974.  In July 1975, he was placed on the injury reserve list with knee problems.  He signed a contract to play for the Montreal Alouettes in March 1976.

Death
On December 13th, 2017, Fred Grambau passed away peacefully surrounded by his loving family.

Notes

1950 births
2017 deaths
Hamilton Tiger-Cats players
Michigan Wolverines football players
People from Alpena County, Michigan